Erik Hanson may refer to:

* Erik Hanson (baseball)
 Erik Hanson (musician), member of Kill Sadie

See also
Eric Hansen (disambiguation)
Erik Hansen (disambiguation)